Sissy Anette ("Philip") Philipsson (born 8 May 1965 in Linköping, Östergötland) is a former Swedish Olympic medley swimmer. She competed in the 1984 Summer Olympics and the 1988 Summer Olympics. She finished 12th in the 200 m individual medley both times.

Clubs
Linköpings ASS

References

1965 births
Swedish female medley swimmers
Living people
Swimmers at the 1984 Summer Olympics
Swimmers at the 1988 Summer Olympics
Olympic swimmers of Sweden
Linköpings ASS swimmers
Sportspeople from Linköping
Sportspeople from Östergötland County
20th-century Swedish women